RMS Empress of Japan was an ocean liner built in 1929–1930 by Fairfield Shipbuilding & Engineering Company at Govan on the Clyde in Scotland for Canadian Pacific Steamships (CP).  This ship was the second of two CP vessels to be named Empress of Japan – regularly traversed the trans-Pacific route between the west coast of Canada and the Far East until 1942.

In 1942, she was renamed RMS Empress of Scotland – the second of two CP vessels to be named Empress of Scotland.  In 1957, the Hamburg Atlantic Line purchased the ship and re-named her TS Hanseatic.

Concept and construction
By the 1920s the Canadian Pacific conglomerate had established a sea/rail connection between Europe and the Far East. The company's steamships would carry passengers from Great Britain to Canada, the same company's railroad carried passengers across the North American continent to Vancouver, where passengers boarded another Canadian Pacific ship that would carry them across the Pacific to Asia. This was at the time the fastest way to reach the Far East from Europe. In the late 1920s Canadian Pacific decided to modernize their Pacific and Atlantic fleets, with the aim of reducing the journey time between Europe and the Far East by two days.

The new liner intended for the transpacific service was envisioned at approximately 25,000 gross register tons,  in length and capable of carrying 1173 passengers in four classes. Construction of the vessel was awarded to Fairfield Shipbuilding & Engineering Company at Govan near Glasgow in Scotland. She was launched on 17 December 1929 and named Empress of Japan. Originally Canadian Pacific had planned on constructing a sister ship for her for the Pacific service, but due to the Great Depression the second ship was left unrealized. Instead, the company decided to concentrate their resources on Empress of Britain, a larger version of Empress of Japan under construction for their trans-Atlantic service. Empress of Britain was approximately  larger than Empress of Japan.

Service history

1930–1942: Empress of Japan
In this period, she was the fastest ocean liner on the Pacific, able to complete a one-way crossing in just nine days.

She would continue sailing the Vancouver–Yokohama–Kobe–Shanghai–Hong Kong route for the rest of the decade.  Amongst her celebrity passengers were a number of American baseball all-stars, including Babe Ruth, who sailed to Japan for a barnstorming tour in October 1934.

The outbreak of war in Europe caused Empress of Japan to be re-fitted for wartime service.

Following the Japanese attacks on the Empire outposts in the Far East in December 1941, the name of the ship needed to be changed.  In 1942, she was renamed Empress of Scotland.

1942–1957: Empress of Scotland

Following the end of World War II, Empress of Scotland was needed to meet the newly developing demands for trans-Atlantic passenger service. In the period between 1948 and 1950, she was rebuilt at Fairfield in Glasgow. These modifications were necessary to better meet weather conditions on the colder Atlantic route. This extensive re-fitting included a radical reconfiguration of her cabins from the original four classes to just two – first and tourist.
In 1951 she carried Princess Elizabeth (later Queen Elizabeth II) and Prince Philip, Duke of Edinburgh returning from their tour of Canada. They departed from St John’s Canada and travelled to Liverpool.
The Canadian Pacific Empress of Scotland completed her last trans-Atlantic crossing in 1957; and she was temporarily laid up in Belfast until being sold.

1958–1966: Hanseatic

Following her sale to Hamburg Atlantic Line in 1958, the ship was radically rebuilt to meet the expanding market for trans-Atlantic passenger service.  The ship's rear funnel was removed, her remaining funnels and superstructure were rebuilt and her passenger accommodations were re-configured.  The vessel emerged as  the  TS Hanseatic.  The renamed and re-flagged ship was designed to carry as many 1350 passengers in comfortable luxury on the Hamburg-New York route.
On 8 September 1966, the ship caught fire at New York. The fire developed in the engine room and gutted five decks. On 28 September, the ship was towed to Hamburg, West Germany for inspection. Deemed beyond economic repair, she was scrapped shortly thereafter.

See also
 Samuel Robinson, first captain (1930–1932)

Notes

References
 Dawson, Philip. (2005). The Liner: Retrospective and Renaissance. London: Conway Maritime Press. ;  OCLC 224483967
 Johnston, Ian. "Govan Shipyard" in  Ships Monthly. June 1985.
 Miller, William H. (1988). Great Ship and Ocean Liners from 1954 to 1986: a Photographic Survey. Mineola, New York: Dover Publications. ;  OCLC 16523042
 __. (1995). The Pictorial Encyclopedia of Ocean Liners, 1860–1994. Mineola, New York: Dover Publications.

External links

 Film of the Empress of Japan entering Esquimalt Harbour in the late 1930s

1929 ships
Ships built on the River Clyde
Ships of CP Ships
Steamships of the United Kingdom
Ocean liners of the United Kingdom
Troop ships of the United Kingdom
Steamships of Germany
Troopships of Canada
Ocean liners of Canada
Maritime incidents in 1966
Ocean liners